Cielo Vista Mall is a shopping mall in El Paso, Texas, United States, owned and operated by Simon Property Group. It is located on El Paso's east side, at Interstate 10 and Hawkins Blvd., and features five anchor stores operating under four brand names, and 117 specialty stores. It is the largest of the three malls in the metro area; its former sister Simon property, Sunland Park Mall, is second.

History
Cielo Vista Mall opened in November 13, 1974 with Dillard's, JCPenney, Montgomery Ward (demolished and rebuilt in 2002 as Foley's, now Macy's) and Rhodes. In 1978, Joske's opened on west end of the mall in the former Rhodes and later became Dillard's West in 1987. The mall's north west end expanded and Sears opened in newly added space in 1982. A parking lot structure was built on top of a small reservoir to expand the parking lot was also added about this time. Cielo Vista Mall has undergone some renovations over the years including 1982, 1993 and in 2005 being the most recent. During the 1993 and 2005 renovations most of the mall's large elaborate fountain pools and interior landscaping were removed to make room for kiosk vendors. All of the large wrap around staircases found throughout the mall were also removed in the 2005 renovation. Simon claims that the mall has 10 million "shopper visits" per year.

A mass shooting occurred at a Walmart next to the mall on August 3, 2019. With 23 killed, it is one of the deadliest shootings in American history.

Another shooting occurred on February 15, 2023, with one death and three injuries. Two suspects were taken into custody.

Anchors
Dillard's North houses Women's departments
Dillard's West houses Men's departments
JCPenney
Macy's
Sears (Only store remaining in Texas)

Former anchors
Foley's (became Macy's in 2006)
Joske's (became Dillard's West in 1987)
Montgomery Ward (closed in 2001, demolished for Foley's)

References

External links
 Simon Property Group
 Cielo Vista Mall Review

Simon Property Group
Buildings and structures in El Paso, Texas
Shopping malls in Texas
Economy of El Paso, Texas
Tourist attractions in El Paso, Texas
Shopping malls established in 1974
1974 establishments in Texas